Brighter/Later: A Duncan Sheik Anthology is a compilation album by American singer-songwriter Duncan Sheik. It was released on Rhino Records in 2006.

Details

The title of the two-disc album is a play on (and tribute to) singer-songwriter Nick Drake's second album, Bryter Layter. In addition to singles, album cuts, and concert favorites, the album contains a number of rarities and previously unreleased tracks, including a studio recording of "Lost On The Moon" (from the international-only version of the Daylight album), "Wishful Thinking" from the Great Expectations soundtrack, an unreleased recording of Joni Mitchell's "Court And Spark", an unreleased remix of "For You", a new live recording of "Home", and "hidden" tracks from Humming (the eight-minute "Foreshadowing") and Daylight ("Chimera").

Track listing

Disc 1: Brighter
"That Says It All" - 4:15
"Court & Spark" - 3:02**
"Lost On The Moon" - 5:09
"Wishful Thinking" - 4:25
"Genius" - 3:42
"Bite Your Tongue" - 3:58
"She Runs Away" - 3:43
"Rubbed Out" - 5:10
"Mr. Chess" - 2:38
"Half-Life" - 3:58
"The Winds That Blow" - 3:03
"In Between" - 4:32
"Mouth On Fire" - 5:39
"Barely Breathing" - 4:15
"Home" (Live @ World Cafe) - 6:45
"On A High" - 3:36

Disc 2: Later
 "Memento" - 3:45
 "Chimera" - 3:55
 "For You" (Jamie Myerson Mix) - 3:18**
 "A Body Goes Down" - 6:07
 "Reasons For Living" - 4:32
 "Foreshadowing" - 8:09
 "Sad Stephen's Song" - 6:29
 "Longing Town" - 3:28
 "Lo And Behold" - 5:12
 "November" - 4:52
 "Days Go By" - 4:48
 "Requiescat" - 4:00
 "Little Hands" - 6:06

**Previously unissued

References 

2006 compilation albums
Duncan Sheik albums
Rhino Records compilation albums